Sybilla livida is a species of longhorn beetle in the Cerambycinae subfamily. It was described by Germain in 1900. It is known from Chile.

References

Bimiini
Beetles described in 1900
Endemic fauna of Chile